Mount Lockwood is a projecting-type mountain  south of Mount Bell, forming a part of the east face of Grindley Plateau in the Queen Alexandra Range, Antarctica. It was named by the British Antarctic Expedition, 1907–09, for Dr. C.B. Lockwood of St Bartholomew's Hospital, where Dr. E.S. Marshall of the expedition had previously been employed. The identification of the feature that bears this name is the interpretation of Ernest Shackleton's intended position for this mountain made by the Southern Party of the New Zealand Geological Survey Antarctic Expedition (1961–62), which explored this region.

References

Mountains of the Ross Dependency
Shackleton Coast